Evidence is a compilation album by Australian hard rock band The Angels, released in December 1994. It reached No. 30 on the ARIA Albums Chart. Two new singles were also released on the album.

In addition to this, The Angels include their cover of The Animals' single "We Gotta Get Out of This Place".  This cover includes a saxophone solo which is not a part of the original arrangement.

The front cover booklet states "This record represents The Angels' first ever opportunity to release a collection of songs which span the entire history of the band. this has been made possible by the collaboration of Mushroom, Sony and Albert"

The manufacturing production code printed on the compact disc is MUSH32367.2, and the catalogue number listed on the back cover insert is TVD93368 (RMD53368).

Track listing

Charts

Certifications

References

1994 albums
The Angels (Australian band) compilation albums
Mushroom Records compilation albums